The 1986 season was Newcastle Rosebud United's third and final season in the National Soccer League. Newcastle Rosebud United finished 6th in their National Soccer League season and were eliminated the NSL Cup second round against Sydney City.

Players

Competitions

Overview

National Soccer League

League table

Results summary

Results by round

Matches

NSL Cup

Statistics

Appearances and goals
Players with no appearances not included in the list.

Clean sheets

References

Adamstown Rosebud FC seasons